The Jardin des Plantes du Mans (8 hectares), also known as the Jardin d'Horticulture du Mans, is a botanical garden located at 4 Rue de Sinault, Le Mans, Sarthe, Pays de la Loire, France. It is open daily without charge.

The garden was created between 1867 and 1870 to designs by Jean-Charles Adolphe Alphand, who also designed Paris's Parc Monceau, Bois de Boulogne, and Bois de Vincennes. It consists of two major sections linked by small tunnels: a French garden (3 hectares) with rose garden and terraced walk planted with four rows of Tilia nearly 100 years old, and an English-style park (4 hectares) with fine trees and a large pond.

See also 
 List of botanical gardens in France

References 

 Jardin des Plantes du Mans
 Le Mans: Historical gardens
 Le Mans: Brief historical article with photos
 Gralon entry (French)
 Culture.fr entry (French)
 Wikimapia entry
 French Wikipedia article :fr:Jardin des plantes du Mans

Gardens in Sarthe
Botanical gardens in France